Read My Lips is the fourteenth album by American singer Melba Moore. It was released by Capitol Records on March 22, 1985. This album featured the hit title track and "When You Love Me Like This". The title track garnered Moore a third Grammy Award nomination for Best Female Rock Vocal Performance, making her just the third black artist after Donna Summer and Tina Turner to be nominated in the category.

Critical reception

AllMusic editor Justin Kantor awarded the album four and a half stars out of five and called it "the most versatile and underrated item in Moore's often overlooked catalog." He found that "with arrangements that are always on the dot, solid songs, and stellar vocals, Read My Lips is a must for every Moore fan's collection."

Track listing

Charts

References

1985 albums
Melba Moore albums
Capitol Records albums
Albums produced by Richard James Burgess